Gug Jalu (also Romanized as Gūg Jalū; also known as Gūgkhalū and Gūjlū) is a village in Zarrineh Rud-e Jonubi Rural District, in the Central District of Miandoab County, West Azerbaijan Province, Iran. At the 2006 census, its population was 839, in 180 families.

References 

Populated places in Miandoab County